Hohenbergia rosea is a plant species in the genus Hohenbergia. This species is native to Brazil.

References

rosea
Flora of Brazil